() (also known as Tyra) is a  creek in Frýdek-Místek District, Moravian-Silesian Region, Czech Republic, in the historical region of Cieszyn Silesia.

It is a left tributary of the Olza River, to which it enters in Třinec. It originates in the Moravian-Silesian Beskids in the elevation of 835 m and flows generally northward through the villages of Tyra and Oldřichovice. Tyrka also flows through the territory of the Třinec Iron and Steel Works before joining Olza.

References 
 

Rivers of the Moravian-Silesian Region
Frýdek-Místek District
Cieszyn Silesia